The Young Knives...Are Dead is a mini-album containing seven songs by The Young Knives, and was released through the independent record label Shifty Disco in 2002. It is notably more raw and aggressive than their most recent work.

Track listing
 "Walking on the Autobahn" – 2:52
 "English Rose" – 3:06
 "John" – 2:55
 "The Night of the Trees" – 2:30
 "Grand Opening" – 3:41
 "Working Hands" – 3:04 
 "Diamonds in the West" – 4:30

Personnel 
 Henry Dartnell – vocals, guitar
 The House of Lords (Thomas Dartnell) – Bass guitar, vocals
 Oliver Askew – drums

References

2002 albums
Young Knives albums